The Split of 1924 was a defining moment in the history of the Christian Reformed Church (CRC) and the Protestant Reformed Churches of America (PRCA). It began especially with the Janssen Case, in which Ralph Janssen, a professor at Calvin Theological Seminary, began to use common grace to back up his ideas about the inspiration of Scripture. Although common grace was not at the forefront of this case, it was the basis for his teachings.  A young minister, Rev. Herman Hoeksema, followed the case closely and recognized common grace as the center, and when the Christian Reformed Synod of 1922 did not deny common grace, he predicted its return. He was, however, in a minority. He and Rev. Henry Danhof became heavily involved in the pamphlet war that broke out shortly thereafter. More protests came in, climaxing in the Synod of 1924. The Synod did not declare anything specifically against the protesting ministers, but by March 1925 Hoeksema was ousted from the church. Although the split is largely known as the Split of 1924, there is no clear point where the Protestant Reformed Churches of America became separate from the Christian Reformed Church.

The Janssen case

The history of common grace in the Christian Reformed Churches begins with the Janssen case. Dr. Ralph Janssen, a professor of Old Testament Theology at Calvin Seminary, began to use it to back up his ideas about the inspiration of Scripture. Four professors at the seminary grew suspicious of his teachings and brought the matter to the board of trustees. The board simply told them that they must address the matter first with Dr. Janssen, who they had not yet approached. These four professors were not pleased with this decision, and appealed to the Synod of 1920. At the synod, the four professors were to bring forward the grounds for an investigation, and Dr. Janssen would be allowed to defend himself and his teachings. The synod then decided that there was not enough evidence to investigate Janssen. Rev. Herman Hoeksema, a young minister and former student of Janssen, had been following this case closely. Although he did not agree with the professors’ methods, he also disliked the synod's decision in the matter. He began to investigate on his own, talking to students and collecting their notes, and, in the spring of 1921, he was appointed to a committee to thoroughly investigate the issue. The committee was split on the issue, and filed separate reports. The issue at the front and center of the Janssen case was not common grace. It was the “infallibility of Scripture, higher criticism, and a liberal view of doctrine and life”. However, Hoeksema (and Rev. Henry Danhof, a fellow member of the committee) saw that behind the issue was common grace. They thus were against his teachings on this basis. The four professors who were critical of Janssen were not on the same ground as Hoeksema and Danhof on this. Hoeksema later said that those who stood against Janssen, but not against common grace, were completely inconsistent. This was one thing that Janssen and Hoeksema agreed on: if one accepts common grace, they must also accept Janssen's views of logic and consistency. In the end, the Synod of 1922 ruled against Janssen's teachings, but did not put down common grace along with them.

Pamphlet war

Those who had supported Janssen soon turned against Herman Hoeksema. They were angry about his role in the case against Janssen. He and Rev. Danhof were definitely a minority in the Christian Reformed Church at the time. A pamphlet war soon broke out.  This was primarily between Revs. Danhof and Hoeksema on one side, and Rev. Jan Karel Van Baalen, of Munster, Indiana, opposed to them. Articles appeared in periodicals, pamphlets were written, and back and forth it went. At this time, Hoeksema and Danhof published Van Zonde en Genade (in English: Of Sin and Grace), a very important pamphlet, and one that was often used against them.

Trouble in Eastern Ave. CRC

On January 19, 1924, three men of the Eastern Ave. congregation (Hoeksema's congregation), approached his door. They brought against him a protest against some of his views. He began to read the letter, but soon stopped. “You are at the wrong door, brethren. This protest is not addressed to me, but to the consistory.”  The men agreed to change their approach, and took the matter before the consistory of Eastern Ave. CRC as public sin. The consistory agreed that this was a public matter, but disagreed that it was sin. They then put the three men under discipline. The next protest came from another member of the congregation, Rev. J. VanderMey (a minister without a congregation). He was told by the Eastern Ave. consistory to bring the issue to Hoeksema first, and then they could look at it. He decided to instead make the matter public, and told consistory that he would instead submit his protest to the May meeting of Classis Grand Rapids East. He, too, was put under discipline for “making secret and false propaganda against his pastor”.

More protests

Two more protests came in, one from Rev. Van Baalen, and an overture from Rev. M. Schans, of Kellogsville. Rev. Van Baalen also submitted his protest to Grand Rapids Classis West, against Rev. Danhof. He was not a member of either classis, and he did not approach either the consistory or the minister. Rev. Schans also didn’t go before either consistory or minister, and he published his overture without the approval of his consistory.

Classis Grand Rapids East 1924

Classis Grand Rapids East began its tumultuous three-day meeting on May 21, 1924, at Eastern Ave. CRC. They declared all four of the protests legal, causing Rev. Hoeksema and Elder O. Van Ellen (of Eastern Ave.’s consistory) to walk out in protest. After this protest, Classis decided to move its meeting to nearby Sherman St. CRC to discuss. After much discussion, they decided that they had never decided to treat the protests, and they requested that Hoeksema return. After still more discussion, they agreed that the protests were not legal, and the protests were sent back to the Eastern Ave. CRC consistory. However, they also concluded that the three who had accused Hoeksema of public sin must be removed from church discipline. Hoeksema refused and said that “further conflict between the classis and the consistory was inevitable”.

Classis Grand Rapids West 1924

Van Baalen's protest against Rev. Danhof in Classis Grand Rapids West was treated somewhat differently. Rev. Van Baalen was told that he must discuss first discuss the matter privately with Danhof. He then must discuss the matter with the consistory of Kalamazoo First CRC, and if it is still not resolved, he may call a special meeting of Classis Grand Rapids West on June 10, 1924. This was a rather odd decision of classis: the special meeting would only be eight days before synod, and Rev. Van Baalen, not a member of Classis Grand Rapids West, would be allowed to call a special meeting.

Synod of 1924

The Synod of 1924 opened on Wednesday, June 18, 1924. The common grace issue was opened thirteen days later, in the eighteenth session of synod, on July 1. At this time, the committee for advice on the issue presented twenty-four pages. The advice of the committee defended both Hoeksema and Danhof, but also common grace. They said that the argument against Hoeksema and Danhof as too one-sided is invalid - supralapsarians have used similar expressions without discipline from the church, and Hoeksema and Danhof maintain that God is not the author of sin. They also advised that they cannot judge Hoeksema based his one-sided emphasis on God's counsel. This has been expressed by supralapsarians throughout the history of the church without discipline, and the committee cannot judge his preaching based on the information they have. The committee also said Hoeksema's preaching could not be criticized. They do not have enough witnesses to do this, the consistory has not complained, and he's not preaching anything that hasn’t been preaching in Reformed churches before. However, the committee also advised that synod make a declaration on the three points of common grace. This is necessary especially because of the strife in the church involving this doctrine. The committee then spent many pages discussing different viewpoints on the topic from various theologians, and many Scriptural passages on the topic. Their overall conclusion is that synod needs to discuss the three points, but a conclusion cannot be made. It must be studied by a large number of both ministers and professors, but not as a committee to form dogma. The formation of dogma must be over a matter of time and the fruit of much discussion. The Synod of 1924 was rather confused and unorganized. Hoeksema was denied a hearing for days, until he finally pleaded, saying he only wanted to speak once. He spoke for two hours, hoping to convince at least some, and make the rest think. He did cause some ministers to doubt common grace, one of whom, Rev. Manni, proposed that synod wait until the next synod to make a decision, when the issue had been studied more thoroughly. Yet, his entreaties failed, and synod formulated the three points. Despite the formulation of the three points, Hoeksema and Danhof were not disciplined by synod, or even told to subscribe to these doctrines. According to Hoeksema, the committee for advice had provided advice on the discipline of the two ministers. If this was indeed true, and deleted, it would imply that synod did not want to discipline the two ministers.

The formation of the Protestant Reformed Churches

Because Hoeksema had not been disciplined by synod, consistory requested that the censured members drop their protest against him. They then went to classis and asked that they rescind the decision to drop the discipline against the three members. When classis refused this request (after discussing it in August meetings), the consistory called a congregational meeting. They met on September 2, 1924, where information of the situation was provided and offer opportunity to the congregation to protest against classis’ decision. The congregation was split on the issue. From November 19 to December 12, Classis Grand Rapids East met again, and neither side was willing to move from its position on the issue. Classis began to insist that Hoeksema and his consistory must “subscribe to the Three Points and promise to abide by them”. Hoeksema refused, and it soon became clear that Classis would depose of him and his consistory because of their refusal. The church was again in tumult. Hoeksema and the majority of the congregation (all but ninety-two of them) continued to worship on the same property. In January 1925, the courts ruled that the majority of the congregation would “remain in possession of the property” until the conflict was settled. At this time, Hoeksema, Danhof, and Rev. George Martin Ophoff and their consistories met and signed an Act of Agreement, where they adopted the name “The Protesting Christian Reformed Churches”. Over the next few months, there were many court cases, culminating in the decision of the Supreme Court of Michigan awarding the Eastern Ave. church property to the ninety-two members who had remained Christian Reformed. But before this, in March 1925, Hoeksema was officially ousted from the church.

References

1924 in Christianity